The Town of Dalby was a local government area of Queensland, Australia which managed the affairs of Dalby. It was amalgamated into the Western Downs Region in 2008.

History
Following a petition of residents, 
the Borough of Dalby was proclaimed a Municipality on 21 August 1863. The first elections for the Dalby Municipal Council held October 1863.

On 31 March, the Borough of Dalby became the Town of Dalby under the Local Authorities Act 1902.

The Shire of Wambo, also headquartered in Dalby and managing areas which surrounded the town, provided many functions in partnership with the Town, including libraries and area promotion.

On 15 March 2008, under the Local Government (Reform Implementation) Act 2007 passed by the Parliament of Queensland on 10 August 2007, the Town of Dalby merged with the Shires of Chinchilla, Murilla, Tara and Wambo and the southern part of Taroom to form the Western Downs Region.

Population

Mayors

References

External links
 Queensland Places: Dalby

Former local government areas of Queensland
2008 disestablishments in Australia
Populated places disestablished in 2008